Don Dyke-Wells (born 13 February 1925) is a South African former rower who competed in the 1952 Summer Olympics.

References

1925 births
Living people
South African male rowers
Olympic rowers of South Africa
Rowers at the 1952 Summer Olympics